Canelo Álvarez vs. Gennady Golovkin III, billed as The Trilogy, was a professional boxing match contested between undisputed super middleweight champion, Canelo Álvarez, and unified middleweight champion, Gennady Golovkin, with Álvarez's super middleweight titles on the line. The fight took place on September 17, 2022.

Background 
After knocking out Amir Khan back in 2016, Álvarez vacated his WBC middleweight title, with Golovkin subsequently being awarded it. Some critics labeled a Álvarez 'a duck' for doing so, believing the Mexican was attempting to 'age out' Golovkin as much as possible. In September 2017, the pair finally fought, and despite Golovkin outlanding Álvarez in 10 of the 12 rounds according to CompuBox, the fight ended in a controversial split draw. Adalaide Byrd's scorecard of 118–110 for Álvarez received a large amount of criticism. Many purists believed Golovkin had done enough to get the decision over Álvarez, and called the fight a 'robbery'.

The controversial outcome led to a rematch taking place, and in September 2018, Álvarez defeated Golovkin via majority decision. However, although not as much as the first fight, there were still claims of a robbery, with people believing that Golovkin had beaten Álvarez twice. There were calls for a third fight, which took time to take place.

Álvarez then became a four-division world champion, before becoming an undisputed world champion. Golovkin won his IBF title back after beating Sergiy Derevyanchenko, and unified the division against Ryōta Murata in Japan. On February 25, 2022, it was announced that Álvarez had signed a two-fight deal with Matchroom Boxing. The first fight of the deal would see Álvarez returning to light heavyweight to face WBA (Super) light heavyweight champion, Dmitry Bivol, before returning to super middleweight to face Golovkin. On May 7, Álvarez was defeated by Bivol via unanimous decision. Despite claiming he would activate his rematch clause and face Bivol again, it was announced on May 24 that Álvarez and Golovkin would fight a third time, five years after their first fight, live on DAZN, with Golovkin moving weight divisions for the first time in his career to do so.

On the fight night, Álvarez defeated Golovkin via unanimous decision with the scores of 115–113 (twice) and 116–112.

Fight card

Broadcasting 
The bout was broadcast live by sports streaming service DAZN to existing subscribers worldwide excluding Latin America. The bout was broadcast on pay-per-view in the United States and Canada.

References

Golovkin 3
2022 in boxing
Boxing in Las Vegas
DAZN
2022 in sports in Nevada
September 2022 sports events in the United States